Charles Christian Swartz (December 1875 - July 26, 1947) was a Democratic Connecticut State Comptroller from 1935 to 1939. He was a one term mayor of Norwalk, Connecticut from 1933 to 1935.

Biography
He was born in South Norwalk, Connecticut on December 5, 1875 to Christian Swartz, the 6th and 8th mayor of South Norwalk, Connecticut and Adora Flynn Swartz.

He attended Yale University and graduated in 1900. He then took a single course in mining engineering at the Columbia School of Engineering and Applied Science.

He died on July 26, 1947 in Norwalk, Connecticut.

Memberships
He was a member of the South Norwalk Lodge of the Loyal Order of Moose.

References 

Connecticut Comptrollers
Connecticut Democrats
Mayors of Norwalk, Connecticut
1875 births
1947 deaths
Yale University alumni
Columbia School of Engineering and Applied Science alumni